Listed below are the dates and results for the 1994 FIFA World Cup qualification rounds for the Asian zone (AFC). For an overview of the qualification rounds, see the article 1994 FIFA World Cup qualification.

A total of 29 teams entered the competition. The Asian zone was allocated 2 places (out of 24) in the final tournament.

Format
There were two rounds of play:
First Round: The teams were divided into 6 groups of 4 or 5 teams each, although Myanmar and Nepal withdrew after playing no matches. The teams would play against each other twice. The group winners would advance to the Final Round.
Final Round: The 6 teams would play against each other once in Qatar. The group winner and runner-up would qualify.

First round

Group A

Iraq advanced to the Final Round.

Group B

Iran advanced to the Final Round.

Group C

North Korea advanced to the Final Round.

Group D

South Korea advanced to the Final Round.

Group E

Saudi Arabia advanced to the Final Round.

Group F

Japan advanced to the final round.

Final round
With Iran, North Korea, and Iraq qualifying for the final round fears were expressed in the United States of those countries potentially turning up at their tournament, since the three nations at the time were under economic sanctions by the United States.

Saudi Arabia and South Korea qualified.

See 1993 Japan v Iraq football match

To date, this was the last time both Japan and Iran failed to qualify for a World Cup.

Qualified teams
The following two teams from AFC qualified for the final tournament.

1 Bold indicates champions for that year. Italic indicates hosts for that year.

Goalscorers

13 goals

 Kazuyoshi Miura

8 goals

 Alaa Kadhim
 Ha Seok-Ju
 Piyapong Pue-On

7 goals

 Ali Daei
 Takuya Takagi
 Khalil Al-Malki
 Saeed Al-Owairan

6 goals

 Gao Hongbo
 Laith Hussein
 Saad Qais
 Ahmed Radhi
 Ali Marwi
 Azman Adnan
 Ryu Song-Gun
 Adnan Al Talyani
 Abdulrazaq Ibrahim Balooshi

5 goals

 Ali Asghar Modir Roosta
 Jasem Al Huwaidi
 Choe Yong-Son

4 goals

 Cai Sheng
 Masashi Nakayama
 Choe Won-Nam
 Mahmoud Soufi
 Khaled Al-Muwallid
 Hamzah Idris Falatah
 Fandi Ahmad
 Varadaraju Sundramoorthy

3 goals

 Khamis Eid Rafe Thani
 Hossain Joarder
 Bhupinder Thakur
 Hamid Derakhshan
 Masahiro Fukuda
 Subhi Al-Gnimaz
 Mohammad Muharam
 Hamed Al-Saleh
 Azizol Abu Haniffah
 Abdul Mubin Mokhtar
 Fahad Al Kuwari
 Mubarak Mustafa
 Majed Abdullah
 Fahad Al-Mehallel
 Choi Moon-Sik
 Lee Ki-Beom
 Mohammad Afash
 Abdul Latif Helou
 Mohamad Moustafa Kadir

2 goals

 Khamis Mubarak
 Karim Mohammed Rumi Rizvi
 Hao Haidong
 Li Bing
 Xu Hong
 Au Wai Lun
 Cheung Kam Wa
 Lee Kin Wo
 Sathyan Vatta Barambath
 Inivalappil Mani Vijayan
 Sudirman
 Hamid Estili
 Mehdi Fonounizadeh
 Naeem Saddam
 Munthir Khalaf
 Radhi Shenaishil
 Tetsuji Hashiratani
 Masami Ihara
 Jeris Tadrus
 Fayez Al-Felaij
 Wail Al Habashi
 Hamoud Al-Shemmari
 Abdullah Wabran
 Rafi Joulfagi
 Paramasivan Ravindran
 Cho In-Chol
 Kim Kwang-min
 Kim Kyong-il
 Yousuf Saleh Al-Alawi
 Rashid Al-Wahaibi
 Mohammed Abdul Noor
 Zamel Al Kuwari
 Sami Al-Jaber
 Ahmed Jamil Madani
 Mohd Rafi Ali
 Hong Myung-Bo
 Kim Tae-Young
 Ko Jeong-Woon
 Park Jung-Bae
 Nizar Mahrous
 Songserm Maperm
 Kiatisuk Senamuang
 Khamees Saad Mubarak
 Mohamed Hassan Abdullah
 Ahmed Abdul Karim Al-Brid
 Omar Mubarak
 Wagdan Mahmoud Shadli

1 goal

 Adel Abdulrahman Marzouq
 Juma Marzouq
 Samir Mubarak
 Ali Saad
 Kaiser Hamid
 Sayed Rumman Sabbir
 Wu Qunli
 Zhao Faqing
 Chen Fu-Yuan
 Chen Jiunn-Ming
 Yeh Ching-Tueng
 Loh Wai Chi
 Tam Siu Wai
 Wong Chi Keung
 Tajinder Kumar
 Rahmad Darmawan
 Singgih Pitono
 Alexander Saununu
 Putut Widjanarko
 Mehdi Abtahi
 Reza Hassanzadeh
 Javad Manafi
 Majid Namjoo-Motlagh
 Mahdi Kadhim
 Habib Jafar
 Ahmed Daham
 Jaffar Omran
 Akram Emmanuel
 Takumi Horiike
 Ruy Ramos
 Masaaki Sawanobori
 Mitsunori Yoshida
 Jamal Abu Abed
 Ahmad Al-Bashir
 Hisham Abed Al-Minem
 Aref Al-Shewaier
 Ayman Al Husaini
 Basel Abdul Rahim
 Fadi Alloush
 Hassan Ayoub
 Youssef Farhat
 Babkin Melikian
 Wael Nazha
 Jamal Taha
 Daniel Pinto
 A. Elangovan
 Zainal Abidin Hassan
 Pang Gwang-Chol
 Yong Jin-Li
 Yun Jong-Su
 Hamdan Abdulla Al-Moamari
 Mattar Al-Mukhaini
 Yunis Aman Al-Naseeb
 Nabil Al-Siyabi
 Tahir Agha
 Abdul Farooq
 Rayed Al-Boloushi
 Sultan Bakhit Al-Kuwari
 Yousef Khalaf
 Abdullah Al-Dosari
 Mansour Al-Mousa
 Mansour Al-Muainea
 Razali Saad
 Steven Tan
 Gu Sang-Bum
 Hwangbo Kwan
 Hwang Seon-Hong
 Jung Jae-Kwon
 Kang Chul
 Kim Pan-Keun
 Noh Jung-Yoon
 Park Nam-Yeol
 Seo Jung-Won
 Shin Hong-Ki
 Ali Cheikh Dib
 Jamal Kazem
 Munaf Ramadan
 Pongthorn Thiubthong
 Mohamed Ahmed
 Ali Thani Jumaa
 Ismail Rashid Ismail
 Fahad Khamees Mubarak
 Nasir Khamees Mubarak
 Hà Vương Ngầu Nại
 Lư Đình Tuấn
 Nguyễn Hồng Sơn
 Phan Thanh Hùng
 Ahmed Bareed
 Saleh Rabiah Ben
 Asam Duraiban
 Sharaf Mahfood

1 own goal

 Robby Darwis (playing against North Korea)

Awards
On 28 October 1993, the experts of FIFA and AFC selected the best players of the competition.

Most Outstanding Player
 Ali Daei

Asian All Stars

See also
1993 Japan v Iraq football match
1994 FIFA World Cup qualification (CAF)
1994 FIFA World Cup qualification (CONMEBOL)
1994 FIFA World Cup qualification (CONCACAF)
1994 FIFA World Cup qualification (OFC)
1994 FIFA World Cup qualification (UEFA)

References

 
Qual
AFC
FIFA World Cup qualification (AFC)